The Delaware United States Senate special election for 1795 was held on March 16, 1795. The former Senator George Read had resigned to take the position of Chief Justice of the Delaware Supreme Court. Henry Latimer defeated the former governor of Delaware, governor of Pennsylvania and Continental Congressmen from Delaware and Pennsylvania by one vote.

Results

See also 
 United States Senate elections, 1794 and 1795

References

Delaware
1795
United States Senate
United States Senate 1795
Special elections to the 4th United States Congress
Delaware 1795